Jaan Talts (born 19 May 1944) is a former Estonian weightlifter. He competed for the Soviet Union at the 1968 and 1972 Olympics and won a silver and a gold medal, respectively. Throughout his career, Talts won two world and four European titles and set approximately 40 world records.

Biography 
As a teenager Talts trained in athletics, in throwing events. He took up weightlifting while studying at the Tihemetsa Technical College of Agriculture and Forestry. In 1967 he became the first middle-heavyweight weightlifter to break the 500 kg barrier in the total, and hence was named the best Soviet athlete of the year. 

After retiring from competitions Talts coached weightlifters in Estonia, and starting from 2007 headed the Estonian national weightlifting team. Between 1981 and 1988 he served as rector of the Estonian Sports Academy. Since 1989 he works with the Estonian National Olympic Committee in various positions. 

In 1995–1996 Talts was member of the Estonian parliament Riigikogu. In 1998 he was inducted into the International Weightlifting Federation hall of fame.

References

External links
 Jaan Talts at Lift Up
 
 
 
 

1944 births
Living people
People from Häädemeeste Parish
Estonian Reform Party politicians
Members of the Riigikogu, 1995–1999
Estonian male weightlifters
Soviet male weightlifters
Olympic weightlifters of the Soviet Union
Weightlifters at the 1968 Summer Olympics
Weightlifters at the 1972 Summer Olympics
Olympic gold medalists for the Soviet Union
Olympic silver medalists for the Soviet Union
Olympic medalists in weightlifting
Medalists at the 1972 Summer Olympics
Medalists at the 1968 Summer Olympics
European Weightlifting Championships medalists
World Weightlifting Championships medalists